The Cuban National Road Race Championships are held annually to decide the cycling champions in both the road race and time trial discipline, across various categories.

Men

Road race

Time trial

Women

Road race

Time trial

References

National road cycling championships
Cycle races in Cuba
Cycling